Débora Fernanda da Silva Nunes (born June 19, 1983 in Porto Alegre) is a Brazilian taekwondo practitioner. She competed for the women's featherweight category (57 kg) at the 2008 Summer Olympics in Beijing, after defeating tall American taekwondo jin Diana López for the gold medal at the Pan American Qualification Tournament in Cali, Colombia. She received an automatic free pass from the first round, after Niger's Lailatou Amadou Lele had been disqualified from the competition. She lost the quarterfinal match by a decisive point from Croatia's Martina Zubčić, with a score of 2–3.

References

External links
Profile – UOL (2008 Olympic Games) 

NBC Olympics Profile

Brazilian female taekwondo practitioners
1983 births
Living people
Olympic taekwondo practitioners of Brazil
Taekwondo practitioners at the 2008 Summer Olympics
Sportspeople from Porto Alegre
21st-century Brazilian women
20th-century Brazilian women